Larry Carlton  is an album released by jazz guitarist Larry Carlton in 1978. It was recorded at his studio, Room 335, in Hollywood, California.

Track listing

Personnel
 Larry Carlton – guitar, lead vocals
 Greg Mathieson – keyboards
 Abraham Laboriel – bass guitar
 Jeff Porcaro – drums
 Paulinho da Costa – percussion
 William "Smitty" Smith – backing vocals
 Steve Carlton - Recording Engineer

References

1978 albums
Larry Carlton albums
Warner Records albums